Trey Mullinax (born June 29, 1992) is an American professional golfer.

Mullinax was born in Birmingham, Alabama. He attended and played golf at Gardendale High School. He played college golf at the University of Alabama where he won two tournaments, was an All-American, and helped the team to the 2013 and 2014 NCAA Championships.

Mullinax turned professional in 2014 and has played on the Web.com Tour since 2015. He won his first Web.com Tour event at the 2016 Rex Hospital Open.

In March 2018, Mullinax came through a Monday qualifier for the Valspar Championship. He then tied for 8th, while playing one shot from inside a hospitality tent when he declined a free drop.
 
In April 2018, Mullinax fired a course record 62 during the third round of the Valero Texas Open at TPC San Antonio, to position himself one shot back going into the final round. He finished as joint runner-up, after a final round 69, to record his best PGA Tour finish to date. He won his first PGA Tour event at the 2022 Barbasol Championship.

Amateur wins (3)
2012 Northern Amateur
2013 Savannah Quarters Individual Intercollegiate, Isleworth Collegiate Invitational

Sources:

Professional wins (3)

PGA Tour wins (1)

1Co-sanctioned by the European Tour

Korn Ferry Tour wins (2)

Results in major championships
Results not in chronological order in 2020.

CUT = missed the half-way cut
"T" indicates a tie for a place
NT = No tournament due to the COVID-19 pandemic

Results in The Players Championship

CUT = missed the halfway cut

U.S. national team appearances
Amateur
Palmer Cup: 2014

See also
2016 Web.com Tour Finals graduates
2021 Korn Ferry Tour Finals graduates

References

External links

American male golfers
Alabama Crimson Tide men's golfers
PGA Tour golfers
Korn Ferry Tour graduates
Golfers from Birmingham, Alabama
1992 births
Living people